At Your Service-Star Power is a Philippine television public affairs show broadcast by GMA Network. Originally hosted by Rhea Santos as At Your Service, it premiered on May 1, 2004. It later moved to QTV in 2005 with Iza Calzado serving as the host. The show concluded in October 2007.

References

External links
 

2004 Philippine television series debuts
2007 Philippine television series endings
Filipino-language television shows
GMA Network original programming
GMA Integrated News and Public Affairs shows
Philippine television shows
Q (TV network) original programming